Frenship High School is a public high school located in Wolfforth, Texas, United States. It is classified as a 6A school by the UIL.  The school serves students in grades 10–12 from Wolfforth, parts of western Lubbock, and southwest Lubbock County, as well as a small eastern portion of Hockley County. In 2015, the school was rated "Met Standard" by the Texas Education Agency.

Naming confusion
When Wolfforth School District was unified with three other rural districts (Carlisle, Hurlwood and Foster) in 1935, they applied for the name "Friendship Independent School District". The application was rejected as the name was already taken by a Houston-area school district; thus, officials opted for the name Frenship.

Curriculum
In January 2007, the Frenship Independent School District and South Plains College jointly created the Frenship Early College High School, which is now known as Frenship Collegiate Prep High School.  The Frenship Collegiate Prep (FCP) program allows students to earn 60 hours of college credit or an associate degree  while earning their high school diploma.  In 2015, FISD created a new partnership with Angelo State University, enabling students to also earn college credit from there.

Athletics
The Frenship Tigers compete in cross country, volleyball, football, basketball, power lifting, soccer, golf, tennis, track, softball, and baseball, bowling, and wrestling.

State titles
Boys' cross country - 2002 (4A)

Notable alumni
 Glen Hardin, musician and songwriter; played keyboards for Elvis Presley from 1970 to 1976
 Tyler Lyons, Major League Baseball pitcher with the New York Yankees
 David Swinford, Texas politician
 David Thomas, NFL tight end

References

External links
 Frenship ISD website

Frenship Independent School District
Schools in Lubbock County, Texas
Public high schools in Texas